Agrón is a Spanish town and municipality located in the eastern part of the region of Alhama, in the province of Granada, autonomous community of Andalusia. It is surrounded by the municipalities of Ventas de Huelma, Escúzar, Alhendín, Jayena, Arenas del Rey and Cacín. Other nearby towns are Pantano de los Bermejales and Ácula. Agrón is one of the fifty-two entities that make up the Metropolitan Area of Granada.

History 
 Its toponym, of Latin reminiscences - "Agrum", which means "Field" - refers to an agricultural activity that has been the livelihood of its inhabitants throughout history. The municipality, in terms of the development of historical events, has been closely linked, like all the others in this area of El Temple, to Alhama de Granada and, like it, has seen the times of theRoman Empire, the long Muslim domination, the subsequent Christianization after the Granada war and, already in the 19th century, the presence in its lands ofNapoleonic troops during the War of Independence.

Today, the Dukes of Wellington own a large estate called Fatimbullar in Agrón.

Demography 
 After the mechanization of the agricultural world, Agrón fell into a deep crisis, decreasing its population continuously since 1960 when there was massive emigration to other parts of the country -mainly to Catalonia- and Germany.

According to the National Statistics Institute of Spain, in 2017 Agrón had 290 registered inhabitants.

Politics 
 The electoral results in the last municipal elections are reflected in the following table: 

The Socialist Party won with 114 votes, and the current mayor is María del Pilar López Romero.

Communications 
The only means of communication that runs through the municipality is the road A-338, named "Carretera de Alhama"

Culture 
Patronal feasts: Its popular festivities are celebrated every year on the weekend before the 15th of August

in honour of the town's patron saint, the Immaculate Conception.

It is also typical of Agrón, as in a good part of the province of Granada, to celebrate the 25th of April the day

of San Marcos, where people gather in the afternoon to taste the popular hornazos -buns of oil in which a boiled

egg is placed- accompanied by green beans.

External links 
 Cultural Heritage of Agrón in the Digital Guide of the Cultural Heritage of Andalusia. Andalusian Institute of Historical Heritage
 Agron's town hall

References

Municipalities in the Province of Granada